Edward Leathley Armitage (26 April 1891 – 24 November 1957) was an Irish-born English cricketer, the son of John Leathley Armitage (1857–1938) and his wife Annie Jessie, née Nicholas. A right-handed batsman and right-arm medium pace bowler, he played first-class cricket for several teams between 1919 and 1933.

Career
Armitage made his first-class debut in August 1919, for Hampshire in a County Championship match against Essex, playing three more County Championship matches that month. He played just once in 1920, against Leicestershire. In 1921 he played twice for Hampshire, against Oxford University and Kent; and twice for the Army, against Cambridge University and Oxford University.

In 1924, after a first-class match for the Army against Cambridge University, he played two matches for the Marylebone Cricket Club (MCC) against his native Ireland, in Dublin and Belfast. He played for the Army against Oxford University and the Royal Navy in 1925, a season in which he played his final first-class match for Hampshire, against Worcestershire.

In 1926 he played for Malaya against Hong Kong and for the Straits Settlements against the Federated Malay States. He returned to English cricket in 1929, playing for the Free Foresters against Cambridge University, for the Army against the RAF and the Royal Navy, and for the MCC against Oxford University and Ireland. Later that year he played a first-class match in India as part of the Bombay Quadrangular tournament.

His final first-class matches were in 1931 for the MCC against Oxford University, and in 1933 for the Viceroy's XI against Roshanara Club in Delhi.

On 28 April 1945 in London he married Lady Katherine Jane Elizabeth Manley, née Carnegie, daughter of the 10th Earl of Northesk, as her second husband. They had no children.

Armitage was the first cousin twice removed of Edward Armitage and Thomas Rhodes Armitage, second cousin once removed of Robert Armitage (MP) and third cousin of Robert Selby Armitage.

References

1891 births
1957 deaths
English cricketers
Malayan cricketers
Straits Settlements cricketers
Hampshire cricketers
Marylebone Cricket Club cricketers
Europeans cricketers
Free Foresters cricketers
British Army cricketers
People from Omagh
Viceroy's XI cricketers